The Sidney Carnegie Library is a historic building in Sidney, Nebraska. It was built in 1914 as a Carnegie library with funding from the Carnegie Corporation, and designed in the Tudor Revival architectural style. There is a grotesque on each side of the main entrance. When the building was dedicated in 1917, it was the first public library in Cheyenne County, Nebraska. A new public library building was built in 1967, and this building was repurposed as the Cheyenne County Chamber of Commerce. It has been listed on the National Register of Historic Places since July 3, 1991.

References

Carnegie libraries in Nebraska
National Register of Historic Places in Cheyenne County, Nebraska
Tudor Revival architecture in the United States
Library buildings completed in 1914